Carlos Alberto Carvalho dos Anjos Junior "Juninho" (born September 15, 1977 in Salvador, Bahia) is a Brazilian professional football striker. He played as an offensive midfielder in Brazil. But after moving to Japan from Palmeiras, he was converted to a striker. In the 2007 season, he won the J1 League top scorer.

In 2008, he said his intention to stay in Japan for the rest of his life and become a naturalized Japanese citizen.  However, he gave up on obtaining Japanese nationality since he found it difficult due to a lack of Japanese language ability.

Club statistics

Honours

Individual
 J2 League Top Scorer: 2004
 J1 League Top Scorer: 2007
 J. League Best Eleven: 2007

Team
 J1 League Runners-up: 2006, 2008, 2009
 J.League Cup Runners-up: 2007, 2009

References

External links

 

1977 births
Living people
Brazilian footballers
Brazilian expatriate footballers
Sociedade Esportiva Palmeiras players
Vila Nova Futebol Clube players
Esporte Clube Bahia players
União São João Esporte Clube players
Expatriate footballers in Japan
J1 League players
J2 League players
Kawasaki Frontale players
Kashima Antlers players
Sociedade Desportiva Juazeirense players
Association football forwards
Sportspeople from Salvador, Bahia